Haplophrentis is a genus of tiny shelled hyolithid which lived in the Cambrian Period. Its shell was long and conical, with the open end protected by an operculum, from which two fleshy arms called helens protruded at the sides. These arms served to elevate the opening of the shells above the sea floor, acting like stilts.

Morphology 
Juveniles could of course be smaller. It is distinguished from Hyolithes by the presence of a longitudinal septum on the middle of the inner surface of the top of the shell.

Its soft anatomy comprises 12(H. carinatus) to 16 (H. reesi) tentacles attached to a horseshoe-shaped lophophore.  A pair of wide structures of uncertain function extend along the length of the conical shell. A larval shell is attached to the shell apex.

Affinity 
The soft anatomy of Haplophrentis was key to establishing the hyoliths as members of the Lophophorata, the group containing brachiopods and phoronids. While some studies supported this interpretation, other studies considered hyoliths as basal lophotrochozoan or mollusk.

Ecology 

Haplophrentis was a filter feeder, using its lophophore to extract organic matter from passing seawater. Specimens of Haplophrentis have been found in the gut of the predator Ottoia.

Occurrence 
186 specimens of Haplophrentis are known from the Greater Phyllopod bed, where they comprise 0.35% of the community. It is also known from several specimens in the Spence Shale, and occurs prolifically at the Marble Canyon locality.  Many specimens at Stanley Glacier display soft tissue well.

References

External links 
 
 

Hyolitha
Burgess Shale fossils
Protostome enigmatic taxa
Fossil taxa described in 1988
Cambrian genus extinctions
Paleozoic life of the Northwest Territories